Sabrina Sultana Keya, also known by her stage name Keya, is a Bangladeshi actress and model who acted in films and television dramas and became model in TVCs.

Biography
Keya made her debut in Dhallywood at the age of 14 with Kothin Bastob in 2001. She acted in Sahoshi Manush Chai in 2003. This film won National Film Award in two categories. Black Money was her last released film which was released in 2015.

Selected filmography
 Kothin Bastob (2001)
 Rangbazz Badsha (2001)
 Bhalobashar Shotru (2002)
 Hridoyer Bandhon (2002) 
 Sahoshi Manush Chai (2003)
 Underworld (2003)
 Khuner Porinaam (2003) 
 Tokai Theke Hero (2003)
 Tumi Shudhu Amar (2003)
 Chai Khamota (2003) 
 Noshto (2004)
 Oporad Domon (2004) 
 Deewana Mastana (2004)
 Danger Hero (2004)
 Palta Akromon (2004) 
 Mission Shantipur (2005)
 Mohobbot Zindabad (2005)
 Nishiddho Jatra (2006)
 Mastan Samrat (2007) 
 Rajdhanir Raja (2008)
 Mone Boro Kosto (2009)
 Tumi Ki Shei (2009)
 Shei Toofan (2010) 
 Bondhu Tumi Shotru Tumi (2011)
 Premik Number One (2013) 
 Ayna Kahini (2013)
 Atmoghatok (2013)
 Black Money (2015)
 Kotha Dilam (2023)

References

Living people
Bangladeshi film actresses
Bangladeshi female models
Bangladeshi television actresses
Year of birth missing (living people)